Hyram A. Marks (8 June 1872 – 17 August 1957) was a rugby union player who represented Australia.

Marks, a lock, was born in Sydney, NSW and attended Sydney Grammar School and Sydney University. He claimed two international rugby caps for Australia and was the University rugby club's first Wallaby representative. His Test debut was against Great Britain, at Sydney, on 24 June 1899, the inaugural rugby Test match played by an Australian national representative side.

Due to funding constraints he was one of only six New South Wales players (Charlie Ellis, Bob McCowan, Lonnie Spragg, Peter Ward & Robert Challoner) selected to make the trip to Brisbane four weeks later for the second Test. His performance in that match was noted as "excellent" by the press.

Sources
 Collection (1995) Gordon Bray presents The Spirit of Rugby, Harper Collins Publishers Sydney
 Howell, Max (2005) Born to Lead - Wallaby Test Captains, Celebrity Books, Auckland NZ

Footnotes

Australian rugby union players
Australia international rugby union players
People educated at Sydney Grammar School
1872 births
1957 deaths
Rugby union players from Sydney
Rugby union locks